The 2012–13 Alania season was their 1st season back in the Russian Premier League, the highest tier of association football in Russia, after relegation during the 2010 Russian Premier League season. It will be their 16th season overall in the top flight. Alania also participated in the 2012–13 Russian Cup, getting knocked out at the Round of 32 stage by FC Tyumen.

Squad

Out on loan

Youth squad

Transfers

Summer

In:

Out:

Winter

In:

Out:

Friendlies

Competitions

Premier League

Matches

Table

Russian Cup

Squad statistics

Appearances and goals

|-
|colspan="14"|Players who left Alania Vladikavkaz during the season:

|}

Goal scorers

Clean sheets

Disciplinary record

References

FC Spartak Vladikavkaz seasons
Alania Vladikavkaz